The National Centre for Historical Memory (NCHM) is a national and public entity attached to the Administrative Department for Social Prosperity (DSP) in Colombia.

History 
The NCHM was created by the Law 1448/2011, also called the Law of Victims and Land Restitution. The NCHM is in charge of contributing to the State´s duty of memory regarding the violations committed during the Colombian armed conflict. Also, it helps on the comprehensive reparation and the right to the truth to which the victims and the entire society are entitled.

The Centre produces public information available for everyone interested, through museum and educational activities that enrich the knowledge of the social and political history of Colombia. In 2021, the NCHM will inaugurate the Colombia’s National Museum of Memory, a platform for the dialogue and articulation of plural memories of the armed conflict that guarantees the inclusion of different actors and populations and contributes to the comprehensive reparation, historical clarification, guaranties of non-repetition and the construction of a sustainable peace.

Deemed to be very close to the Colombian government and the Armed Forces, the Centre was excluded in 2020 from the International Coalition of Sites of Conscience (which brings together more than 200 museums and memorials in over 60 countries). According to associations of victims of the conflict and historians, the center carries out "negationist" work by reducing the armed conflict to a struggle between the State and "terrorists.

The government approved the so-called "veterans' law," which provides that a space in the National Memory Museum be dedicated "to displaying to the public the life stories of veterans of the public force, especially highlighting their courageous actions, their sacrifice and their contribution to the general welfare.

The director of the organization, Darío Acevedo, resigned on July 7, 2022, following a complaint filed against him by the Special Jurisdiction for Peace for having altered documents, when he did not have the right to do so, in order to conceal the role of paramilitarism in the conflict. Darío AcevedoHe faced several controversies and was criticized by victims' associations who accused him of denial. In particular, he signed a controversial agreement with José Félix Lafaurie, president of the Colombian Federation of Cattle Breeders (FEDEGAN), to highlight the role of cattle breeders in the conflict, while FEDEGAN has often been criticized for financing paramilitary groups and opposing reparations to victims through land restitution.

Organization  
To fulfill its mandates and strategic objectives, the NCHM is divided into four large areas: 
	Construction of Historical Memory Directorate
	National Museum of Memory Directorate
	Human Rights Archive Directorate 
	Truth Agreements Directorate

One of its main objectives is the contribution to the clarification of the facts, the culprits and the conditions that made the armed conflict possible, as well as the institutional, political and social dynamics that unleashed and degraded the conflict.

Also, the NCHM works to:
	Consolidate the role of memory as a right and public patrimony.
	Dignify the victims and clarify the violent acts committed during the armed conflict.
	Plan, construct and deliver to the country the National Museum of Memory as a place that dignifies the victims and promotes a culture respectful of human rights.

Reports published

2008 
 Trujillo: A tragedy that Never Ceases

2009 
 El Salado: That War was not Ours
 Memories in Wartime
 Toolbox: Recall and Narrate the Conflict

2010 
 Bojayá: War Without Limits
 La Rochela: Memoirs of a Crime Against Justice
 The Bahía Portete Massacre: Wayuu Women in the Spotlight
 The Disputed Land
 Memories of Dispossession and Peasant Resistance in the Caribbean Coast (1960 - 2010)

2011 
 Women and War: Victims and Resistance in the Colombian Caribbean
 Women Who Make History: Earth, Body and Policy in the Colombian Caribbean
 San Carlos: Memories of Exodus in War
 The Invisible Footprint of War: Forced Displacement in the Comuna 13
 The Unarmed Order. The resistance of the Workers' Association Peasants of Carare
 To Silence Democracy. The Massacres of Remedios and Segovia 1982-1997
 El Tigre Massacre: Reconstruction of Historical Narrative in the Valle del Guaméz - Putumayo

2012 
 El Placer: Women, Coca and War in the Bajo Putumayo
 “Our life has been our struggle”. Memory and Resistance in the Indigenous Cauca
 Justice and Peace: Judicial Truth or Historical Truth?
 Law of Justice and Peace: The Silences and the Forgetfulness of Truth
 Justice and Peace: Lands and Territories from the Paramilitary Perspective

2013 
“Basta Ya!” Colombia: Memories of War and Dignity. This document gives an account of 50 years of armed conflict in Colombia, revealing the enormous magnitude, ferocity and degradation of war and the serious consequences and impact on the civilian population.
 Guerrilla Forces and Civilian Population. Path of the FARC 1949 - 2013
 A Kidnapped Society
 Agrarian Policies and Land Reform in Colombia: Sketch of an Institutional Memory
 Challenges for Reintegration: Approaches to Gender, Age and Ethnicity

2014
 Remember to Repair. The Massacres of Matal of Flor Amarillo and Corocito in Arauca
 Archive of grave violations to Human Rights. Elements for Public Policy
 Masters and Farmers: Land, Power, Violence in Valle del Cauca
 Putumayo: The Maelstrom of Rubber Plantations
 Notebook of Damages Caused by the Violence
 Truth Agreements Directorate (TAD) Reports
 New Scenarios of Armed Conflict and Violence. Panorama of post-agreements with Paramilitaries of Caribe Region, Department of Antioquia and Department of Choco
 New Scenarios of Armed Conflict and Violence. Panorama of post-agreements with Paramilitaries of Northeast and Middle Magdalena, Eastern Plains, Southeast and Bogota
 Make War and Kill Politics
 Enforced Disappearance

2015
 Overview I contributed to the truth
 Annihilate the difference
 The legacy of the absent. Leaders and important people in the history of El Salado
 The word and silence
 A journey through the historical memory
 Disarmament, demobilization and reintegration
 Del ñame espino al calabazo
 Series: A displaced nation
 A displaced nation. National report of the displacement in Colombia
 Razed villages. Memories of the displacement in El Castillo (Meta)
 Licensed to move: Massacres and reconfiguration territorial in Tibú, Catatumbo
 Crossing the border: Memories of the exodus towards Venezuela. The case of the Arauca River
 Primer: Criminal law and war
 Quintín Lame: first indigenous guerrilla of Latin America
 Roads for memory
 Toolbox for Managers of Human Rights Archives
 Buenaventura: A Port Without Community
 Corporal Texts of Cruelty: Historical Memory and Forensic Anthropology
 Narratives of Life and Memory
 Memory, Territory and Peasant Struggles
 Lucho Arango: The Advocate of Artisanal Fishing
 That Day the Violence Arrived by Canoe…
 Historical Memory from the Territorial Sphere
 Communicate During the Conflict, Memoires of Eduardo Estrada

2016
 Crimes that do not prescribe
 Petroleum, coca, territorial dispossession and social organization in Putumayo
 Pogue: the memory made of songs
 Social cleansing. Limpieza social. Una violencia mal nombrada (Spanish)
 Right to justice as a guarantee of non-repetition
 Memories of a forgotten massacre
 La maldita tierra (Spanish)
 La justicia demanda memoria (Spanish)
 Esa mina llevaba mi nombre (Spanish)
 Land and rural conflicts
 Granada. Memories of war, resistance and reconstruction
 Until you find them. The drama of enforced disappearance in Colombia
 Cartillas: Desde el Carare, la niñez y la juventud siembra cultura de paz (Spanish)

2017
 The hidden war: landmines and explosive remnants in Colombia
 Grupos armados posdesmovilización (Spanish) - Armed groups that emerged after the demobilization
 Architecture, memory and reconciliation
 Tomas y ataques guerrilleros (1965 - 2013) (Spanish) - (1965-2013) guerrilla attacks
 Herramienta Metodológica del Monumento Sonoro por la Memoria (Spanish)
 Travesía por la memoria: Ruta metodológica para la reconstrucción de memoria histórica con niños, niñas y adolescentes (Spanish) - Journey through memory: Methodological path for the reconstruction of historical memory with children and adolescents

References

External links

 NCHM Official Web Site
  Administrative Department for Social Prosperity (DSP)
 Publications of the National Center for Historical Memory
 Publications of the National Center for Historical Memory - Biblioteca Nacional
 Articles in the newspaper El Tiempo about the National Center for Historical Memory
 Articles in the newspaper El Espectador about the National Center for Historical Memory
Videos from the National Center for Historical Memory
Audio from the National Center for Historical Memory

Colombian conflict
Museums in Colombia
Military and war museums
Human rights museums